Tom O'Connell (born 14 June 2000) is an Australian cricketer from Geelong, Victoria who plays as a bowling all-rounder, bowling right-arm leg spin.

He made his List A debut for Victoria in the 2018–19 JLT One-Day Cup on 16 September 2018. He made his Twenty20 debut for the Melbourne Stars in the 2018–19 Big Bash League season on 14 January 2019.

References

External links
 

2000 births
Living people
Australian cricketers
Place of birth missing (living people)
Melbourne Stars cricketers
Victoria cricketers